The Qarhan Playa or  also misleadingly described as , is a playa in the Golmud and Dulan counties of Haixi Prefecture, Qinghai, China. Formerly a single unitary lake, it is now an expansive salt flat divided into four greater sections (Dabusun, Big/Small Bieletan, Suli, and N./S. Huoluxun) which contain a number of smaller salt lakes, the largest of which is Dabusun Lake. The area is heavily exploited for its valuable salt, mineral, and rare earth reserves but parts are also protected as a national park and contribute to regional tourism.

Name
The Chinese name, which does not distinguish between actual salt lakes and playas, also causes the playa to be called a "lake" or even "the largest salt lake in China" in less careful English sources.

Geography
The southwest lies in Golmud and the northeast in Dulan County, both in Haixi Prefecture, Qinghai, China. The roughly  area of Qarhan inclusive of Taijinar to its west is sometimes known as the Sanhu ("Three Lakes"), after the two Taijinar lakes, Suli Lake, and Dabusun. Qarhan is part of the larger Qaidam Basin, lying between the Kunlun Mountains to the south, the Altun to the west, and the Qilian to the north.

In the playa's hyperarid climate, there is generally only  of annual rainfall but   of annual evaporation. Despite this, meltwater rivers and mineral springs fill the basins of the salt flat's four main sectionsBieletan, Dabusun, Qarhan, and Huoluxunwith about ten large but shallow lakes usually collectively occupying an area of about : Suli Lake in the west, fed from the west by the Urt Moron; the Little and Big Biele Lakes beside it, fed from the south by the Tuolahai and Qingshui Rivers; West Dabusun and Dabusun Lake (the largest), in the center, fed from the south by the Golmud River; Dongling Lake to their northwest; Xiezuo and Tuanjie Lakes to their east, fed respectively by the intermittent Quanji and Shougong Rivers; and North and South Hulsan Lakes at the east end of the playa, fed from the east by the Qaidam, Nuomuhong, and Suolinguole Rivers. There are also some ephemeral lakes. Most of the streams contributing to these lakes flow north into the playa from the Kunlun and its foothills. The Golmud River is the main contributor, providing a mean annual influx of 19.2 trillion L (5.07 trillion gal) of water. There is also contribution of about 1% from mineral springs, especially on the north end of the playa, which play an important role in the chemical composition of the sediment.

The local flora consists of sparse forbs (particularly members of Chenopodioideae) and shrubs, especially members of Ephedra and Tamarix.

Geology
The 50 billion metric tons (55 billion short tons) are estimated sufficient to meet present world demand for 1,000 years. The area around Dabusun Lake has halite to depths of at least , although with alternating layers of mud in places. The salinity of the playa's lakes varies between 164.81 and 359.50 g/L (1.3–3 lb/gal); their pH values are between 5.4 and 7.85.

Other minerals include potash, carnallite (potassium magnesium chloride), calcium chloride, magnesium, lithium, boron, iodine, and sylvite. The basin is one of China's richest sources for potassium, with an estimated  of potassium oxide. Its reserves are also important as the world's largest present-day accumulation of potassium-rich salt in the world, which helped scientists better understand the chemical and evaporation pathways involved in the creation of natural potash and disprove previous suppositions that it only formed in marine environments. The Sanhu as a whole holds 83% of the country's known lithium reserves, with some areas having concentrations of 330 ppm.

History

Paleoclimatologists believe that the playa's basin was created by tectonic activity during the Mesozoic. Between 770,000 and 30,000 years ago the basin constituted an enormous lake, which alternated nine times between being a fresh- and saltwater lake. Tectonic activity also shifted the lake's tributaries and basins, although it remained with the present-day playa during this period. It was cut off and became saline again around 30,000 years ago and began precipitating salts about 25,000 years ago. It has been shrinking in size by evaporation for most of that time, eventually separating into the current separate lakes.

Until the recent commercial exploitation of the salts and other minerals, the district remained largely unpopulated, as the salt deposits made it difficult for the nomads of northwestern China to use the area for their herds.

National geological expeditions began investigating Qinghai in the 1950s, shortly after the establishment of the People's Republic of China. The major expedition to the Qarhan Playa was undertaken in 1955–6, but the area's important carnallite (and thus potassium) reserves were discovered accidentally by geologists Zheng Mianping and Liu Dagang during a stroll on 2 October 1957. The next year, an exploratory well discovered the Yanhu Gas Field north of Dabusun Lake. Over the next decade, more detailed surveying and prospecting were undertaken while China continued to depend on Canadian imports for its potash. Commercial exploitation of the basin's own potash began in 1989, following the expansion of the PRC's Opening Up and Reform Policy. The opening of the Qinghai Potash Fertilizer Factory increased China's production of potassium chloride sixfold, from less than  a year at Haixi and Tanggu to just under  a year. As of 2010, production was over  a year at the main site, with smaller operations around the playa each producing a further  a year.

During a 2016 inspection tour, Chinese Communist Party general secretary Xi Jinping praised the importance of the factories and their workers to the entire country but emphasized the need for Qarhan's development to be environmentally responsible. As part of a national program to increase the use of electric cars, automobile companies like BYD have since moved to the area, opened factories, and signed contracts with local mining companies to exploit the area's lithium supplies. Infrastructure has been improved, including an overhaul of Golmud Airport.

Tourism
The fertilizer factory is now open to the public for free tours, and its parent company maintains a nearby museum covering the geology of the playa and hosting various salt sculptures. The area was designated a national mining park on 1 August 2008.

Transportation

Sections of the G3011 Liuge Expressway and the Qingzang Railway run over the playa's salt flats.

See also
 List of lakes and salt lakes in China

Notes

References

Citations

Bibliography
 .
 .
 .
 .
 .
 .
 .
 .
 .
 .
 .
 .
 .
 .
 .
 .
 .
 .
 .
 .
 .
 .

Salt flats
Salt flats of China
Geography of Qinghai
Haixi Mongol and Tibetan Autonomous Prefecture